Prostějov is a city in the Olomouc Region of the Czech Republic. It has about 43,000 inhabitants. The city is known for its fashion industry. The historical city centre is well preserved and is protected by law as an urban monument zone.

AČR special forces unit 601. skss is based in Prostějov.

Administrative parts

Town parts and villages of Čechovice, Čechůvky, Domamyslice, Krasice, Vrahovice and Žešov are administrative parts of Prostějov.

History
The first written mention of Prostějov is from 1141. In 1365, the settlement was promoted to a market town and in 1390 to a town. Before 1390, Prostějov was acquired by the Lords of Kravaře and joined to the Plumlov estate. It remained part of it until 1848 and shared its owners and destinies.

An Augustinian monastery was founded in 1391, but it was destroyed before 1430 by the Hussites. From 1454, the Jewish community lived in Prostějov. In 1495, the Plumov estate with Prostějov was bought by the Pernštejn family and the construction of the town walls began. The Prostějov Castle was built in 1522–1526 by Jan of Pernštejn as a part of town walls. In 1568–1572 the castle was rebuilt in the Renaissance style.

The Pernštejn family owned Prostějov until 1599. From 1599 to 1848, it was a property of the House of Liechtenstein. The monastery of the Merciful Brothers was established between 1727 and 1730. The Capuchin monastery was established in 1764, but was abolished in 1784.

In 1869, the demolition of the city walls began. Thanks to the Jewish community in particular, Prostějov has become an important commercial and industrial centre. Mass production of textile clothing began in the 1840s and at the end of the century, the textile industry gained a privileged position in the whole of Austria-Hungary (one-third of the state's total production was from Prostějov). In the late 19th century, Prostějov was the third largest city in Moravia after Brno and Jihlava.

In the Austrian Empire and Austria-Hungary, Prostějov was part of the Margraviate of Moravia. In 1918, it became part of independent Czechoslovakia. The period of German occupation lasted from March 1939 until May 1945. During this time, Prostějov was administered as a part of the Protectorate of Bohemia and Moravia. The Jewish community basically disappeared as a result of the Holocaust.

During the socialist period, prefabricated housing estates were built on the outskirts of the city (built in 1963–1990) and extensive demolitions took place in the historic centre.

Demographics

Economy
The city is historically associated with the textile industry. The tradition began already in 1500 when a tailor's guild was founded. In the middle of the 19th century the very first clothing factory in Europe was built here. In 1910, the industry employed 12,000 people.

Oděvní podnik Prostějov, the biggest textile company in the country with about 10,000 employees, was founded in 1964. After the fall of communism in Czechoslovakia, the company failed to restructure and adapt to market mechanisms, and went bankrupt in 2010. Nowadays, the tradition is held by several smaller companies.

Sport
The city is known for the tennis club TK Prostějov, connected with many of the biggest names of the Czech tennis history.

Prostějov is home to the football club 1. SK Prostějov, which plays in Czech National Football League (2nd tier), and to the ice hockey club LHK Jestřábi Prostějov, which plays in the 1st Czech Republic Hockey League (2nd tier).

Sights

The historic centre is formed by the T. G. Masaryka Square and its surroundings, which include several other smaller squares. The central square is lined by burgher houses with Renaissance or Baroque cores, and facades mostly from the 19th and 20th centuries. One of the houses is the birthplace of Jiří Wolker, one of the most important natives. In the middle of the square is a Baroque Marian column from 1714.
 
Prostějov Castle on the Pernštýnské Square is one of the most significant buildings in the city. It was reconstructed after 1893 and decorated with modern sgraffito by Jano Köhler. Today it is owned by the city.

The Museum and Gallery in Prostějov is located in the former town hall from 1530. The museum has been housed in this Renaissance building since 1905.

The National House is a national cultural monument, considered a masterpiece of Czech modernism and Art Nouveau. It dates from 1905–1907.

Ecclesiastical monuments
The Church of the Exaltation of the Holy Cross, founded together with an Augustinian monastery in 1391, is the oldest monument in Prostějov. The originally Gothic church was later baroque modified. It is decorated with frescoes by Jano Köhler and with the Way of the Cross cycle by František Bílek.

The Church of Saint John of Nepomuk, built in 1750–1755, is a part of the former monastery of the Merciful Brothers. The Church of Saints Cyril and Methodius was founded together with the Capuchin monastery. In the early 20th century, it was neo-Baroque rebuilt and consecrated to Saints Cyril and Methodius.

The former Old Synagogue was originally a yeshiva, rebuilt into a synagogue with Empire style elements in the 1830s. Today it is privately owned and inaccessible. The former New Synagogue was built opposite the old one in 1904, originally in Art Nouveau style. After the World War II, it was sold to Czechoslovak Hussite Church and arranged as a prayer house of this church, which it is to this day. Other Jewish monuments in the city are several old preserved houses, the new cemetery established in 1908, and the remains of the old cemetery, the surface of which was devastated during the war.

Notable people

John Filipec (c. 1431–1509), bishop and diplomat
Meir Eisenstadt (c. 1670–1744), author of rabbinic literature
Jonathan Eybeschutz (1690–1764), rabbi
Moses Sofer (1762–1839), rabbi
Gideon Brecher (1797–1873), Austrian physician and writer
Moritz Steinschneider (1816–1907), bibliographer, orientalist
Ignaz Brüll (1846–1907), Austrian pianist and composer
Rosa Sonneschein (1847–1932), journalist and editor
Nathan Porges (1848–1924), rabbi
Konrad Loewe (1856–1912), Austrian actor and playwright
Edmund Husserl (1859–1938), German philosopher
Ondřej Přikryl (1862–1936), writer and politician; mayor of Prostějov in 1914–1919
Rudolf Alfred Höger (1877–1930), Austrian painter
Carmen Cartellieri (1891–1954), Austrian actress
Jiří Wolker (1900–1924), poet, journalist and playwright
Edvard Valenta (1901–1978), journalist and writer
Lola Beer Ebner (1910–1997), Israeli fashion designer
Otto Wichterle (1913–1998), chemist, inventor of contact lens
Otakar Hořínek (1929–2015), sports shooter, Olympic medalist
Antonín Přidal (1935–2017), translator and writer
Milena Dvorská (1938–2009), actress
Oldřich Machač (1946–2011), ice hockey player
Nina Škottová (1946–2018), politician
Rostislav Václavíček (born 1946), footballer
Vlastimil Petržela (born 1953), football player and manager
Luděk Mikloško (born 1961), footballer
Petr Hořava (born 1963), physicist
Paulina Porizkova (born 1965), Swedish-American model and actress
Karel Nováček (born 1965), tennis player
Robert Změlík (born 1969), decathlete, Olympic winner
Radoslav Látal (born 1970, football player and manager
Gabriela Míčová (born 1975), actress
Lukáš Krajíček (born 1983), ice hockey player
Petra Cetkovská (born 1985), tennis player 
Petra Kvitová (born 1990), tennis player; lives here

Twin towns – sister cities

Prostějov is twinned with:
 Środa Wielkopolska, Poland
 Vysoké Tatry, Slovakia

References

External links

Jewish history

 
Populated places in Prostějov District
Cities and towns in the Czech Republic
1141 establishments in Europe
Shtetls